WSWE-LP is an Adult Album Alternative formatted broadcast radio station licensed to Sweet Briar, Virginia, serving Sweet Briar and Amherst in Virginia.  WSWE-LP is owned and operated by Sweet Briar College.

References

External links
 92.7 The Briar Online
 92.7 The Briar on Facebook
 

2014 establishments in Virginia
Adult album alternative radio stations in the United States
Radio stations established in 2014
SWE-LP